Thil-sur-Arroux (literally Thil on Arroux) is a commune in the Saône-et-Loire department in the region of Bourgogne-Franche-Comté in eastern France.

Thil-sur-Arroux is popular with many nationalities. A high percentage of the homes are second/vacation homes. The area is part of the Morvan Park region and has some of the best air quality in Europe.

See also
Communes of the Saône-et-Loire department
Parc naturel régional du Morvan

References

Communes of Saône-et-Loire